The Crime (International Co-operation) Act 2003 (c.32) is an Act of the Parliament of the United Kingdom covering mutual assistance in criminal matters.

External links 

United Kingdom Acts of Parliament 2003